Bathytoma prodicia is a species of sea snail, a marine gastropod mollusk in the family Borsoniidae.

Description
The size of an adult shell varies between 35 mm and 55 mm.

Distribution
This species occurs in the Indian Ocean off East and South Africa (Southern Mozambique to Zanzibar)

References

External links
 
  Bouchet P., Kantor Yu.I., Sysoev A. & Puillandre N. (2011) A new operational classification of the Conoidea. Journal of Molluscan Studies 77: 273-308.
 Alexander V. Sysoev, Deep-sea conoidean gastropods collected by the John Murray Expedition, 1933-34; Bulletin of the Natural History Museum. v.62 # 1 (1996), London

prodicia
Gastropods described in 1986